The following are songs written by Jay Sean.

2003
"Dance with You" - #12 at UK top chart

2004
"Stolen" - #4 at UK top chart
"Eyes on You" - #6 at UK top chart

2008
"Ride It" - #11 at UK top chart
"Maybe" 
"Tonight"

2009
"Down" - #1 at Billboard Hot 100

2010
"Do You Remember" - #10 at Billboard hot 100
"I Made It" - #21 at Billboard hot 100
"2012 (It Ain't the End)" - #31 at Billboard hot 100

2011
"Hit the Lights" - #18 at Billboard hot 100

2012
"I'm All Yours" - #85 at Billboard hot 100

References

Sean, Jay